Adna is a given name of Hebrew origin. Notable people with the name include:

 Adna Anderson (1827–1889), US engineer
 Adna Chaffee (1842–1914), Lieutenant General in the United States Army
 Adna R. Chaffee, Jr.  (1884–1941), major general in the United States Army
 Joseph Adna Hill (1860–1938), American statistician
 Adna R. Johnson (1860–1938), U.S. Representative from Ohio
 Adna Wright Leonard (1874–1943), US Methodist bishop
 Adna mac Uthidir (fl. 1st-century AD), Irish poet
 LaMarcus Adna Thompson (1848–1919), US inventor and businessman

References